William Wayne Kidd Jr. (born November 28, 1959) is a former American football Center who played for the Houston Oilers of the National Football League (NFL). He played college football at University of Houston.

References 

1959 births
Living people
Players of American football from Dallas
American football centers
Houston Cougars football players
Houston Oilers players